Datura is a genus of flowering plants.

Datura may also refer to:

 Datura (band), an Italian dance group
 "Datura (song)", a Tori Amos song
 1270 Datura, an asteroid
 Datura (video game), a video game.